Robert Bakker (born 9 December 1962) is a Dutch rower. He competed in the men's quadruple sculls event at the 1988 Summer Olympics.

References

External links
 

1962 births
Living people
Dutch male rowers
Olympic rowers of the Netherlands
Rowers at the 1988 Summer Olympics
People from Mijdrecht
Sportspeople from Utrecht (province)